Soprano Sax (also released as Soprano Today) is the debut album by Steve Lacy which was released on the Prestige label in 1958. It features performances by Lacy, Wynton Kelly, Buell Neidlinger and Dennis Charles.

Reception
The Allmusic review by Bob Rusch awarded the album 4.5 stars stating "This was the first of three recordings soprano saxophonist Steve Lacy made for Prestige and this 11/1/57 session was his first as a leader...There was a controlled tension to this date, like everybody's trying to play, carefully, to a common goal. It's almost as if someone were present to make sure everybody stayed within obvious perimeters.".

Track listing
 "Day Dream" (Strayhorn, Ellington) - 4:23
 "Alone Together" (Dietz, Schwartz) - 6:35
 "Work" (Monk) - 5:24
 "Rockin' in Rhythm" (Ellington, Mills, Carney) - 4:05
 "Little Girl, Your Daddy Is Calling You" (Unknown) - 4:32
 "Easy to Love" (Porter) - 8:25

Recorded in Hackensack, November 1, 1957

Personnel
Steve Lacy - soprano saxophone
Wynton Kelly - piano
Buell Neidlinger - bass
Dennis Charles - drums

References 

1958 debut albums
Steve Lacy (saxophonist) albums
Prestige Records albums
Albums produced by Bob Weinstock
Albums recorded at Van Gelder Studio